The Darkness is the tenth studio album by American hip hop duo Twiztid. It was released on January 27, 2015, through Majik Ninja Entertainment with distribution via INgrooves. Recording sessions took place at the Dojo, a MNE recording studio in Michigan. Production was handled by Michael "Seven" Summers, Jake One, Eric Davie, Fritz the Cat and the Dead Beatz.

The album peaked at No. 29 on the Billboard 200, at No. 3 on the Top Rap Albums chart, and No. 5 on the Independent Albums chart in the United States.

Background 
In early/mid 2014 Twiztid released a promo video, and it was said that Twiztid's next album would be called The Darkness. Twiztid was asked if the album would have any features and Monoxide had said "No. This is just me and Jamie from start to finish, no features". It was in contrast to the duo's previous release A New Nightmare in 2013, which had a large array of guest features.

Twiztid stated in a later 2014 interview that they would release short promo videos from December 2014 until January 2015 to help promotion for the album. They said that some of the videos they are in, and some of them they aren't. On November 26, 2014, Twiztid released the album cover art, and the track list for The Darkness. Two of the three bonus tracks ("Breakdown" and "Mind Goes Mad") were featured on their Get Twiztid EP (which was previously released on April 15, 2014 and on the Bootleg Banner Tour with Blaze Ya Dead Homie), albeit slightly edited in length. The third bonus track "A Place in the Woods" was previously released as a limited edition VIP single, with a slightly different mix.

On December 3, 2014 Twiztid released the first single off the album, "Boogieman". On December 9, 2014 Twiztid released the second single via Rolling Stone website titled, "Back to Hell". On December 17, 2014 Twiztid released their first promo video for their upcoming album, The Darkness, titled "Hostage". On January 8, 2015, via Revolver (magazine), Twiztid released the third single off The Darkness titled "A Little Fucked Up". On January 9, 2015 Twiztid released the second promo video for The Darkness titled "Family Time". The first music video off the album was "A Little Fucked Up" which was released on February 11, 2015. On March 17, 2015, the second music video, "Boogieman" was released via Revolver. On July 9, 2015, the third music video, "No Breaks", was released via Twiztid-Shop.com, their online store.

Track listing

Personnel 
Jamie "Madrox" Spaniolo – lyrics, vocals, music
Paul "Monoxide" Methric – lyrics, vocals, music
Ashley M Price – vocals (tracks: 1, 8)
Sid Haig – vocals (track 5)
Eric Davie – additional vocals (track 8), producer (track 16), engineering
Michael Winagar – additional vocals (track 8)
Bill Moseley – vocals (track 10)
Michael "Seven" Summers – producer (tracks: 2, 8-9, 11-14, 18-19)
The Dead Beatz – producer (tracks: 3, 17)
Fritz "The Cat" Van Kosky – producer (track 4), engineering
Jacob Brian Dutton – producer (tracks: 6, 15)
Joe Strange – producer (track 16), additional producer (tracks: 6, 8, 9), mixing
Kullen Cruickshank – assistant engineering
Jim Kissling – mastering
Tate Steinsiek – art direction, artwork
Eric Shetler – additional artwork
Jim Neve – design, layout
Jason Shaltz – photography
George Vlahakis – management
Chris Rouleau – lyrics & vocals (track 19)

Charts

References

External links

2015 albums
Twiztid albums
Hardcore hip hop albums
Albums produced by Jake One
Majik Ninja Entertainment albums
Albums produced by Seven (record producer)